Nicollet Mall is a light rail station on the Metro Blue Line and Green Line in Minneapolis, Minnesota. Adjacent to the light rail platforms is the southbound Metro Orange Line bus rapid transit station Marquette & 5th Street.

This station is located on 5th Street South, between Nicollet Mall and Marquette Avenue in Minneapolis. This is a center-platform station with one westbound traffic lane south of the platform. Service began at this station when the Blue Line opened on June 26, 2004. In 2013 Metro Transit began constructing an additional northbound platform in conjunction with and as part of the Nic on Fifth apartment building. The additional platform was built to provide additional comfort and safety at the station, as well as alleviating overcrowding and providing additional capacity for Southwest LRT. While scheduled open March 2017, the new platform was opened December 22 later that year. It is the only station on the system where passengers can regularly board from either side of the train.

Design and public art
The original station was designed by ESG Architecture & Design, with Thomas Rose as the design team artist. To reflect the tall buildings of downtown and vibrant energy of Nicollet Mall, the station's design incorporates undulating steel columns down the center flanked by dual curving metal roofs. This design earned the station the affectionately nickname "The Roller Coaster". The new northbound platform was designed by ESG's Trace Jacques, who also served as project designer for Nic on Fifth.

The public art installation, Small Kindness, Weather Permitting, by Janet Zweig has four interactive boxes at the station: Please turn the wheel #11, Thanks a million #28, Ring the bell and see #19, and Hit the bell! #1.

Notable places nearby
 Nicollet Mall
 Gaviidae Common
 Soo Line Building
 510 Marquette Building
 Minneapolis Central Library
 Wells Fargo Center
 Marquette Plaza
 IDS Center

References

External links 
Metro Transit: Nicollet Mall Station

Metro Green Line (Minnesota) stations in Minneapolis
Metro Blue Line (Minnesota) stations in Minneapolis
Railway stations in the United States opened in 2004
2004 establishments in Minnesota
Bus stations in Minnesota